Rondebosch Boys' School may refer to:
 Rondebosch Boys' High School
 Rondebosch Boys' Preparatory School